Palisade Canyon is a canyon along the Humboldt River in northern Eureka County, Nevada, United States.

Description

The Humboldt River, rather than flowing into the ocean, eventually loses all its water to evaporation in the Humboldt Sink, and stream-gage measurements undertaken by the United States Geological Survey suggest that Palisade Canyon is the point where the river's flow ceases to increase and begins to decrease.

The canyon was named from a fancied resemblance to the Hudson River Palisades.

References

External links

Canyons and gorges of Nevada
Landforms of Eureka County, Nevada
California Trail
History of the Great Basin